The 1976–77 Montenegrin Republic League was the 32nd season of Montenegrin Republic League, the third tier of the Yugoslav football league system. The season started in August 1976 and finished in June 1977.

Summary

16 teams participated in the 1976–77 season. Among the clubs which didn't play the previous season was Sutjeska and Titograd (relegated from Yugoslav Second League) and three best teams from Regional leagues - Igalo, Komovi and Dečić.

That was the first time since 1954–55 that Sutjeska, who's traditionally one of two strongest Montenegrin sides, played in Republic League. At the end of season they took out the title finishing four points ahead of second place Titograd. They also became the first team which won both the Montenegrin Republic League and the Montenegrin Republic Cup during the same season.

Table

Higher leagues 
In the 1976–77 season, three Montenegrin teams played in the higher leagues of SFR Yugoslavia. Budućnost participated in 1976–77 Yugoslav First League, while two other teams (Lovćen and Jedinstvo) participated in 1976–77 Yugoslav Second League.

See also 
 Montenegrin Republic League
Montenegrin Republic Cup (1947–2006)
Montenegrin clubs in Yugoslav football competitions (1946–2006)
Montenegrin Football Championship (1922–1940)

References 

1976-77
1976–77 in Yugoslav football
1976–77 in European third tier association football leagues